Lyne railway station served the village of Lyne, Scottish Borders, Scotland from 1864 to 1950 on the Symington, Biggar and Broughton Railway.

History 
The station opened on 1 February 1864 by the Symington, Biggar and Broughton Railway. The goods yard was to the north. A temporary signal box was built in 1906 to accommodate extra traffic for the Royal Highland Show. The station closed in 1950.

References

External links 

Disused railway stations in the Scottish Borders
Railway stations in Great Britain opened in 1864
Railway stations in Great Britain closed in 1950
1864 establishments in Scotland
1950 disestablishments in Scotland
Former Caledonian Railway stations